The title of Baron Manny was created in the Peerage of England on 12 November 1347, as a barony by writ. It became extinct in 1389.

Barons Manny (1347)
 Walter Manny, 1st Baron Manny (d. 1372)
 Anne Hastings, 2nd Baroness Manny (1356–1384), suo jure
 John Hastings, 3rd Earl of Pembroke and Baron Manny (1372–1389)

References

1347 establishments in England
Extinct baronies in the Peerage of England
Noble titles created in 1347